Abschied von den Wolken is a 1959 German aviation adventure film directed by Gottfried Reinhardt, written by Georg Hurdalek, based on a story by Ladislas Fodor. The film stars O. W. Fischer, Peter van Eyck, Sonja Ziemann, Horst Frank, Linda Christian and Paul Dahlke.

Abschied von den Wolken was an example of the disaster film, coming soon after the international success of William Wellman's The High and Mighty (1954) where individual stories of passengers and crew were central to the dilemma of an aircraft in trouble. In the film, film historian Bertil Skogsberg described the scenario aboard an airliner: "The passengers are of various nationalities and dispositions: a revolutionary general fleeing his country with most of its cash, an old Nazi, and a Dutch adventurer, to name only a few. There is also a beautiful stewardess (Sonja Ziemann)".

When marketed in the United States, the film was renamed Rebel Flight to Cuba.

Plot
Leaving the island of San Quinto , marked by revolutionary struggles, soldier-of-fortune Peter von Houten barely escapes a firing squad. He is pardoned and is to be deported on a scheduled flight en route from Mexico City to Bermuda. The San Quinto military government, however, forces the airliner down in an unscheduled stop.

Inside the aircraft, Captain Pink Roberti and his copilot Richard Marschall are both in love with the stewardess Carla. In a hijacking attempt of the airliner to Caracas, Roberti is shot and van Houten manages to disarm the attackers but the aircraft landing gear is damaged.

Ultimately, with the copilot unable to successfully master the approach to Bermuda, van  Houten, a former pilot, takes charge. He lands safely after a breakneck approach, bringing in the airliner in a belly landing, saving the lives of passengers, although the aircraft is seriously damaged. The co-pilot dies in the exploding aircraft.

Cast

O. W. Fischer as Peter van Houten
Sonja Ziemann as Carla
Peter van Eyck as Pink Roberti
Horst Frank as Richard Marshall
Christian Wolff as Mischa Gomperz
Paul Dahlke as Dr. Quartz
Chariklia Baxevanos as Stella Valencias
Günter Pfitzmann as Howard Sims
Leon Askin as General Cordobas
Linda Christian as Countess Colmar
Erica Beer as Cecily Sims
Cora Roberts as Doris
Olga Plüss as François Leclerc
Silvia Reinhardt as Eva Roberti
Paul Esser as Monsignor Scarpi
Martin Berliner as Rabbi Birnbaum
Friedrich Schoenfelder as Reverend Wilson
Hans W. Hamacher as Joe
Werner Stock as 1st chess player
Hugo Lindinger as 2nd chess player
Jochen Blume as radio operator Emilio
Heinz Spitzner as Prof. Thomas
Bruno W. Pantel as Businessman
Wolfgang Völz as Engineer Albert
Gerd Martienzen as Man in the Tower

Production
Despite being a low-budget film, Abschied von den Wolken used at least one real aircraft, seen in stock footage. Flying for the fictional "Aerovias Internationales", a Handley Page HP. 81 Hermes had the registration "DN-947". The Hermes IV was filmed at Berlin Tempelhof Airport, where the British Skyways of London operated.

A scale model of the Hermes was used for aerial views. Other scenes included a Vickers Viscount take-off and the engines and the landing gear of a Douglas DC-4, a type that resembled the Hermes. A scale model of a Fouga Magister was used to depict a San Quinto military aircraft. Interiors were shot at the Spandau Studios with sets designed by the art directors Paul Markwitz and Heinrich Weidemann.

Using his connections to Hollywood, director Gottfried Reinhardt managed to have Abschied von den Wolken released in the United States. The English-language version was re-titled Rebel Flight to Cuba.

Reception
Film historian and critic Ephraim Katz wrote in the International Film Encyclopedia (1990), "O.W. Fischer as a jack-of-all-trades and unshaven friend of humanity aboard an airliner threatened by storms, criminals and technical catastrophes. Staged according to common patterns, the bundling of adventurous moments of danger does not contribute to the credibility of the story."

The review in Der Spiegel noted, "Gottfried Reinhardt's attempt with this flyer film in the still unexplored regions of the thrill of German film manufacturers, ends early in simple film cinema. The director used long-worn tension effects (hurricane and abdominal landing, childbirth, jealousy and gun beating aboard), but even more so than the chassis clamped book (Georg Hurdalek) and directing. Only the stubble bearded O. W. Fischer loosely gives, in his Peter Voss role. (CCC)."

See also
Zero Hour! (1957)

References

Notes

Citations

External links

1950s disaster films
German disaster films
West German films
Films set on airplanes
German aviation films
Films set in the Caribbean
Films about aviation accidents or incidents
Films about aircraft hijackings
Films shot at Spandau Studios
Films directed by Gottfried Reinhardt
1950s German films
1950s German-language films